Matthiola parviflora, the smallflower stock, is a species of flowering plant in the family Brassicaceae, native to Madeira, the Canary Islands, the Iberian Peninsula, North Africa, Israel and Jordan. It has been discovered invading the Sonoran Desert, beginning around Tucson, Arizona.

References

parviflora
Flora of the Canary Islands
Flora of Madeira
Flora of North Africa
Flora of Portugal
Flora of Spain
Flora of Palestine (region)
Plants described in 1812